The 2006–07 season in Hong Kong football, starting July 2006 and ending June 2007:

Overview
The number of teams in the First Division will increase from eight to ten as the HKFA has decided to keep the two bottom teams last season, South China and Hong Kong 08, in the First Division, while HKFC and Wofoo Tai Po are promoted.

Wofoo Tai Po, who earned promotion to the First Division by finishing second in the Second Division, will play their first ever season in the top division of Hong Kong football.

Events

21 July 2006 – Tim Bredbury takes over as head coach of Rangers, replacing Qiu Jingwei.
1 August 2006 – Portuguese Jorge Amaral takes over as head coach of South China
13 August 2006 – Kitchee play Chinese Super League club Shanghai Shenhua in a pre-season exhibition match, Canon Cup, at the Hong Kong Stadium. After a 1–1 draw in regulation time with the home team, Shenhua request to cancel to take the penalty shootout, the title is shared.
2 September 2006 – The First Division League season begins with Happy Valley and Xiangxue Sun Hei drawing 1–1.
19 September 2006 – Xiangxue Sun Hei are beaten by Jordanian Al-Faisaly 2–2 (4–5 on penalties), in the AFC Cup quarter-final.
25 September 2006  –  Rangers sack head coach Tim Bredbury after a 1–1 draw at Happy Valley, Cheung Wai Hong takes over as caretaker coach.
11 October 2006 – Brazilian-born defender Cristiano Preigchadt Cordeiro makes his international debut for Hong Kong in the 2007 AFC Asian Cup qualifying match against Qatar.
4 November 2006 – Kitchee, the last unbeaten team in the First Division League up to now, lose 2–0 to South China at Mong Kok.
15 November 2006 – Hong Kong played the last game in their 2007 AFC Asian Cup qualifying round group F against Bangladesh. After 2 wins and 2 draws in six games, Hong Kong ended 3rd in the group.
30 November 2006 – Brazilian Casemiro Mior is appointed new head coach of South China, replacing Jorge Amaral.
10 December 2006 – The Senior Shield kicks off, with HKFC beating Hong Kong 08 2–1 in the first round.
12 December 2006 – Former England international midfielder Steve McManaman visits Hong Kong at the invitation of Rangers chairman Carson Yeung Ka Shing.

Representative team

Hong Kong team
For all-time list, see Hong Kong national football team results

Hong Kong have gone through their Asian Cup 2007 qualifying campaign, where they ended 3rd in group F.

Hong Kong futsal team
2007 AFC Futsal Championship
13 May 2007 –  6–4 
14 May 2007 –  0–8 
15 May 2007 –  3–2

Hong Kong U-23
2006 Asian Games

29 November 2006 –  1–1 
3 December 2006 –  1–2 
6 December 2006 –  1–0 

Guangdong-Hong Kong Cup

30 December 2006 – Guangdong 1–0 
7 January 2007 –  3–2 (4–2 Extra Time) Guangdong
Hong Kong captured the championship of 29th Guangdong-Hong Kong Cup

2008 Olympic Games Qualifying

Preliminary Round
7 February 2007 –  0–3  
14 February 2007 –  0–1 
Second Round (Group B)
28 February 2007 –  3–0  
14 March 2007 –  0–2 
28 March 2007 –  0–1 
18 April 2007 –  0–1 
16 May 2007 –  0–4 
6 June 2007 –  vs

Hong Kong U-19
AFC U19 Youth Championship Qualification Competition 2007

Hong Kong U-16
AFC U16 Youth Championship Qualification Competition 2007

Hong Kong U-14
EAFF U-14 Youth Festival 2006 held in China
21 July 2006 –  4–0 
21 July 2006 –  1–4 
21 July 2006 –  3–0 
22 July 2006 –  0–3 
22 July 2006 –  0–3 
22 July 2006 –  1–0 
22 July 2006 –  0–1 
23 July 2006 –  0–7 
23 July 2006 –  1–0 
25 July 2006 –  1–0

Hong Kong U-13
2007 AFC (U13) Festival of Football held in Beijing, China
14 April 2007 –  8–0 
14 April 2007 –  0–2 
14 April 2007 –  0–0 
15 April 2007 –  0–4 
15 April 2007 –  1–3 
15 April 2007 –  0–4 
17 April 2007 –  7–0 
17 April 2007 –  0–5 
18 April 2007 –  3–1

Honours

Asian clubs competitions

AFC Cup 2006

Xiangxue Sun Hei – Quarter finals
Happy Valley – Group phase

AFC Cup 2007

Happy Valley
Xiangxue Sun Hei

Local competitions

Exhibition Matches

Canon Cup

Transfer deals

Transfers
Updated 21 May 2007

1 July 2006
 Xiao Guoji from Kitchee to Rangers
 Chiu Chun Kit from Rangers to Wofoo Tai Po

3 July 2006
 So Loi Keung from Rangers to Wofoo Tai Po

4 July 2006
 Poon Man Tik from Xiangxue Sun Hei to Happy Valley
 Marcio Gabriel Anacleto from Rangers to Xiangxue Sun Hei
 Li Hon Ho from Xiangxue Sun Hei to Wofoo Tai Po
 Christian Kwesi Annan from Eastern to Wofoo Tai Po
  Manprit Singh from HKFC to Wofoo Tai Po
 Lo Chun Kit from Citizen to Hong Kong 08

11 July 2006
 Li Chun Yip from Happy Valley to Citizen, loan
 Fung Chun Ting from Happy Valley to Citizen, loan

13 July 2006
 Man Pei Tak from Rangers to South China

14 July 2006
 Leung Chi Wing from Xiangxue Sun Hei to Kitchee
 Luk Koon Pong from South China to Kitchee

15 July 2006
 Li Hang Wui from Citizen to Kitchee
 Ha Shing Chi from South China to HKFC
 Zhang Chunghui from Rangers to South China

16 July 2006
 Wei Zhao from South China to Rangers
 Tse Man Wing from South China to Xiangxue Sun Hei

22 July 2006
 Leung Tsz Chun from South China to Rangers

23 July 2006
 Fung Ka Ki from Kitchee to Rangers

27 July 2006
 Stephen Joseph Musah from Lanwa Redbull to Citizen
 Delphin Tshibanda Tshibangu from Lanwa Redbull to Citizen
 Julius Akosah from Xiangxue Sun Hei to Kitchee

31 July 2006
 Vítor Hugo to Happy Valley

1 August 2006
 Marco Almeida to South China
 Carlos Oliveira to South China
 Hugo Coelho to South China
 André Correia to South China
 Detinho to South China
 Rineo Sousa to South China, trial
 Li Haiqiang from Chengdu Wuniu to South China, loan
 Tang Jinkai from Chengdu Wuniu to South China, loan

2 August 2006
 Ju Yingzhi from Dalian Shide to Citizen, loan

4 August 2006
 Alex Xavier to Rangers

14 August 2006
 Tales Schutz to South China, loan
  Lawrence Akandu from Tung Po to HKFC
 Leung Kam Fai from Happy Valley to Wofoo Tai Po

18 August 2006
 Ivan Cop to Xiangxue Sun Hei, trial

22 August 2006
 Lee Wai Tik from South China to HKFC
 Pau Ka Yiu from Xiangxue Sun Hei to HKFC

28 August 2006
 Chan Hon Hing from Hong Kong 08 to HKFC
 Michel Platini Ferreira Mesquita from Grêmio to South China, loan

31 August 2006
 Tung Ho Yin from Rangers to Xiangxue Sun Hei

10 September 2006
 Yu Yang to Rangers

16 September 2006
 Ayock Louis Berty to Rangers
 Cheng Lai Hin from Kitchee to HKFC, loan

27 September 2006
 Edgar Aldrighi Junior to Wofoo Tai Po
 Joel Bertoti Padilha to Wofoo Tai Po
 Silvano Pessoa Monteiro to Wofoo Tai Po

29 September 2006
  Manprit Singh from Wofoo Tai Po to HKFC

6 October 2006
 Kyle Jordan from Sheffield Wednesday to Xiangxue Sun Hei, loan
20 October 2006
 Mihailo Jovanović to Rangers
 Engelo Rumora to Wofoo Tai Po

3 November 2006
 Bai He from Chengdu Wuniu to South China, loan
 Zhang Jianzhong from Guangzhou Pharmaceutical to South China
 Vítor Hugo from Happy Valley to Xiangxue Sun Hei

9 November 2006
 Torin William Didenko to HKFC
 Mihailo Jovanović from Rangers to South China
 Destiny O Ugo from Fukien AA to HKFC
 Li Hang Wui from Kitchee to HKFC, loan

17 November 2006
 Ícaro to Happy Valley
 Vandré to Happy Valley
 Joao Miguel Pinto da Silva to Xiangxue Sun Hei
  Manprit Singh from HKFC to Rangers

24 November 2006
 Ghislain Bell Bell to Rangers
  Cristiano Alves Pereira to South China
  Colly Barnes Ezeh from Happy Valley to Xiangxue Sun Hei

6 December 2006
 Petri Jalava to South China, trial

9 December 2006
 Li Ming to Happy Valley
 Engelbert Romaric Asse-Etoga to Happy Valley
 Blaise Ndolar to Happy Valley

15 December 2006
 Victor Inegbenoise to Xiangxue Sun Hei
 Colin Baker to Rangers, trial

12 January 2007
 Jorginho to Citizen
 Waldir to South China
 Picoli to South China
 Liang Zicheng to South China
 Wang Gang to Lanwa Redbull
 Duan Gaoyuan to Lanwa Redbull
 Luo Jing to Lanwa Redbull
 Francis Yonga to Kitchee
 Cornelius Udebuluzor to Rangers

23 January 2007
 Richard Jeffries to HKFC

2 March 2007
 Liu Lei to Lanwa Redbull
 Wang Fengqing to Lanwa Redbull
 Zhang Sheng to Lanwa Redbull
 Chan Chun Yu to South China
 Anderson da Silva to Kitchee
 Ye Jia to Rangers
 Alexandre de Moraes to Rangers

15 March 2007
 Delphin Tshibanda Tshibangu to Citizen
 Yaw Anane from Citizen to South China

16 March 2007
 Cheung Tsz Kin from Kitchee to HKFC, loan
 Lo Chi Hin from Kitchee to HKFC, loan
 Wisdom Fofo Agbo to Rangers
 Hon Kwok Chun to Wofoo Tai Po
 Li Shu San to Wofoo Tai Po

17 March 2007
 Colin Baker from Rangers to HKFC
 Tam Kwok Fu to Wofoo Tai Po
 Antonio Serrano to Xiangxue Sun Hei

17 March 2007
  Jaimes McKee from HKFC to Kitchee
 Lai Kai Cheuk from Shek Kip Mei to Xiangxue Sun Hei
 Juninho Petrolina to Happy Valley
 Marcão to Happy Valley
 Denisson to Happy Valley
 Cleiton Mendes dos Santos to South China
 Chan Wai Ho from Rangers to South China, HKD$40k

Retirements

Deaths
Yuen Kuen Tao, 63, former Hong Kong international.
Henry Fok, 83, former member of FIFA's executive committee HKFA's Life Honorary President.

References

External links
HONG KONG FOOTBALL: Season 2006–07 (Archived 2009-10-22)
 總結香港代表隊2006年的成績(一) at HKFA.com
 總結香港代表隊2006年的成績(二) at HKFA.com
 總結香港代表隊2006年的成績(三) at HKFA.com